Orbirail was a name for a suggested orbital railway route around London.

It would have connected the extended North London Line, East London Line, the South London Line and the West London Line, possibly including the Gospel Oak to Barking Line. The combined line would have orbited London in Zone 2, Zone 3 and (possibly) Zone 4.

It is not to be confused with London's existing circular railway, the Circle line of the London Underground.

Status 
Although Orbirail had no official status as a planned project, the completion of Transport for London's London Overground on 9 December 2012 achieved substantially the same objective.

On 12 February 2009, Mayor Boris Johnson and Transport Secretary Geoff Hoon announced £75 Million to fund the southern extension of the Overground network between Surrey Quays and Clapham Junction as part of the East London line extension, creating the final connection of an orbital railway for London to be completed in time for the 2012 Summer Olympics.  However, the timeline published by TfL in April 2011 stated the line would not open until late 2012, well after both the Summer Olympics and Paralympics.

History of orbital railways in London 

London's railway system was largely built in the 19th century, by competing private companies. The benefits of an integrated transport system were unknown at this time and each main-line railway company built its own terminus in central London and operated radial routes from that point. For example, Waterloo railway station in south-west central London is the focus of lines radiating out to the south and west. Meanwhile, metropolitan and suburban railways developed also on radial lines.

The first orbital rail service was the Inner Circle, now the Circle line, operated over the central sections of the Metropolitan line and District line. This linked most of the main-line stations and was a commercial success.

This success led to the operation of a number of other semi-orbital routes within the capital, over existing main-line routes and sections of the Inner Circle:
 Middle Circle - Aldgate to Mansion House via Addison Road (now Kensington Olympia)
 Outer Circle - Broad Street to Mansion House via Willesden Junction
 Super Outer Circle - St Pancras to Earl's Court via Cricklewood and South Acton

London was a much smaller city than it is now and most commercial activity was focused at the centre. These outer routes failed to attract the passenger numbers hoped for and were eventually cut back or ended while other, more radial services on the lines continued.

Other semi-orbital routes fared little better. Throughout the 20th century London's railways operated on a radial model and the few remaining semi-orbital passenger routes withered, with the lines used mainly for freight services. The national railway network was privatised with radial franchises. Only the Circle line enjoyed success.

Throughout the 20th century London expanded both in size and population and employment ceased to be as heavily concentrated in the centre. Many more people were travelling through central London by Underground and many of them were travelling in on one radial route only to travel out again on another. Congestion increased and additional Underground lines were built at great expense.

The idea of reviving and expanding the semi-orbital routes to relieve some of the load on central London in a more cost-effective way than the building of new tube lines was considered, coalescing around the suggested name "Orbirail", but it won few friends in the National Rail network for commercial and operational reasons.

The situation changed drastically with the creation of Transport for London as a single body with overall responsibility for transport in London. During Ken Livingstone's term as Mayor of London, TfL exploited the potential in the neglected peripheral rail routes and started to plan a complete orbital rail system by joining these routes together (albeit with no plan for a single fully orbital service). The new system was eventually launched as the London Overground, and work continues to complete the orbital route as more lines are added to the system. The eventual London Overground network will (by 2013) cover a route which bears a striking resemblance to the Outer Circle line with the East London line extension and South London Line being used to complete the loop.

Political support for the principle of Orbirail continued after the change of leadership following the 2008 London mayoral election. During his election campaign, Boris Johnson published a transport manifesto which highlighted the problems associated with orbital journeys around London:

R25

The R25 was a proposed railway orbital around the Zone 3 area of London. First proposed in the Mayor of London's £1.3 trillion London Infrastructure 2050 plan, the line would have used some existing Network Rail and London Overground lines, linked by stretches of new railway.

Arguments for and against 

The manifesto noted that 64% of journeys in outer London were made by cars or vans, and suggested that improved orbital public transport would help to reduce this figure, proposing a trial of orbital express bus routes linking key suburban rail terminals.

Orbirail'''s proponents believe that it would be a relatively low-cost project, involving only a small amount of new track, some improvements to existing lines and an increase in train frequency. It would allow many people to make journeys without passing through Zone 1'', thus relieving congestion on central London's railways.

There are complications which could prevent these lines running as single fully orbital route. Orbital railways have an intrinsic timetabling robustness problem. The trains are constantly "in orbit" so there is little scope for "recovery time" if they are delayed. A single delay can have long-lasting knock-on effects and be much more disruptive than on a radial railway. Recovery time can be created by timetabling for longer stops at some stations but this increases journey times and reduces train frequency. (For this reason, on 13 December 2009 the Circle line was changed to a spiral route with distinct endpoints.) In this light, it is hard to see a larger and more complicated orbital railway being approved.

An alternative to a single fully orbital route would be two or more semi-orbital routes that join to encircle London. TfL's London Overground is an example of this: in Clapham Junction and in Highbury and Islington, the two halves of the London Overground Orbital Route meet.

An additional problem is poor interchange with many of the radial routes. The proposed route offers no interchange with the Great Western Main Line, Chiltern Main Line, the East Coast Main Line, the Great Eastern Main Line or the London, Tilbury and Southend line. Only local services on the West Coast Main Line stop at Willesden Junction. It has similarly poor interchange with many London Underground lines. Poor interchange options are a general problem with most of London's older railways, which were built by competing private companies in the 19th century before the need for a coherent and integrated transport network was understood.

References

External links
 
 

London Overground